Charles H. Scott (October 18, 1860 – ?) was an American politician in the state of Washington. He served in the Washington House of Representatives.

References

Members of the Washington House of Representatives
1860 births
Washington (state) Populists
People from Saline County, Missouri
Year of death missing